Michael Hohnstedt (born 3 May 1988) is a German footballer who plays for SpVgg Union Varl.

Career
Hohnstedt ended his professional career at the end of the 2018-19 season and returned home to his former youth club SpVgg Union Varl.

References

External links

Michael Hohnstedt at FuPa

1988 births
Living people
Association football fullbacks
German footballers
VfB Lübeck players
Sportfreunde Lotte players
VfL Osnabrück players
BSV Schwarz-Weiß Rehden players
3. Liga players
Regionalliga players
People from Ostercappeln
Footballers from Lower Saxony